Ossett is a ward in the metropolitan borough of the City of Wakefield, West Yorkshire, England.  The ward contains twelve listed buildings that are recorded in the National Heritage List for England.  Of these, one is listed at Grade II*, the middle of the three grades, and the others are at Grade II, the lowest grade.  The ward contains the town of Ossett, the village of Gawthorpe, and the surrounding area.  The listed buildings include houses, former industrial buildings, a pair of locks on the Calder and Hebble Navigation, two churches, a town hall, a water tower, a war memorial, and a telephone kiosk.


Key

Buildings

References

Citations

Sources

 

Lists of listed buildings in West Yorkshire
Listed